A cap-house (sometimes written cap house or caphouse) is a small watch room, built at the top of a spiral staircase, often giving access to a parapet on the roof of a tower house or castle. They provided protection from the elements by enclosing the top of the stairway, and sometimes incorporated windows or gun loops. They were built in various forms, including square turrets, simple boxes, or small houses with gabled roofs, which were sometimes large enough to provide accommodation for a look-out.

Cap-houses were an authentic feature of the design of medieval and early-modern tower houses in Scotland, and were a frequent element used in the later Scottish Baronial architecture.

Gallery

Medieval and early-modern cap-houses

Nineteenth-century Scottish Baronial cap-houses

See also 
 Turret—a tower that projects vertically from the wall of a building
 Bartizan—an overhanging projection from the wall of a building
 Garret—an attic or top floor room in the military sense; a watchtower from the French word garite

References

Castle architecture
Fortification (architectural elements)
Fortified towers by type